Buckskin (1968) is a Western film, released by Paramount Pictures, released on a low budget and starring an all-star cast. The main stars were Barry Sullivan and Joan Caulfield. Lon Chaney Jr. plays the role of Sheriff Tangley and Richard Arlen plays a townsman. The other stars were Barbara Hale, John Russell, Wendell Corey, Bill Williams, Leo Gordon, George Chandler, Aki Aleong and Barton MacLane. The film was also known as The Frontiersman. It was the last of the series of A.C. Lyles Westerns for Paramount. The screenwriter Michael Fisher was the son of the series screenwriter Stephen Gould Fisher.

Betty Hutton was originally selected to play the role of Nora Johnson, but she was fired.

The film also has a small racial twist, common in films of the late 1960s. Sung Lee (played by Aleong) is a Chinese worker who is a victim of prejudice, Chaddock (Sullivan) fights for him during the film.

Plot

Cast
Barry Sullivan (Chaddock)
Joan Caulfield (Nora Johnson)
Wendell Corey (Rep Marlowe)
Lon Chaney Jr. (Sheriff Tangley)
John Russell (Patch)
Barbara Hale (Sarah Cody)
Barton MacLane (Doc Raymond)
Bill Williams (Frank Cody)
Richard Arlen (Townsman)
Leo Gordon (Travis)
Jean-Michel Michenaud (Akii)
George Chandler (Storekeepper Perkins)
Aki Aleong (Sung Li)
Michael Larrain (Jimmy Cody)
Craig Littler (Browdie)
James X. Mitchell (Baker)
Emile Meyer (Corbin)
Robert Riordan (Telegrapher)
Le Roy Johnson (Bartender)
Manuela Thiess (Moni)

See also
List of American films of 1968

External links

1968 films
1960s English-language films
Paramount Pictures films
1968 Western (genre) films
American Western (genre) films
Films directed by Mickey Moore
Films scored by Jimmie Haskell
1960s American films